The following is a timeline of the history of the city of La Rochelle.

Prior to 20th century

 10th C. - La Rochelle existed under the name of Rupella.  
 1199 – "Communal charter" granted Eleanor, duchess of Aquitaine.
 1209 - Lantern Tower founded.
 1219 – La Rochelle besieged during the Albigensian Crusade.(fr)
 1224 – Siege of La Rochelle (1224) by forces of Louis VIII of France.
 1360 – English in power again per Treaty of Brétigny.
 1372 – June: Naval Battle of La Rochelle; English forces defeated.
 1384 – Saint Nicolas Tower & The Chain Tower built.
 1390 –  (tower) built.
 1468 –  (tower) built.
 1571 – Seventh national synod of the French reformed churches and affirmation of faith with the Confession de La Rochelle.
 1573
 Siege of La Rochelle (1572–73) during the French Wars of Religion.
 24 June: Peace of La Rochelle treaty signed.
 1621 – Blockade of La Rochelle begins during Huguenot rebellion.
 1627 – Siege of La Rochelle begins.
 1628 – Siege ends.
 1648 – Roman Catholic diocese of La Rochelle established.
 1677 – Carmelite convent built.
 1694 –  (administrative entity) created.
 1719 –  established.
 1732 –  founded.
 1784 – Saint-Louis Cathedral consecrated.
 1790 – La Rochelle becomes part of the Charente-Inférieure souveraineté.
 1796 –  established.
 1797 – Bibliothèque communale de La Rochelle (library) established.
 1800 – Population: 17,512.
 1801 – Cantons of La Rochelle Est and Ouest created.
 1815 – Société littéraire de La Rochelle founded.
 1829 – L'Echo Rochelais newspaper begins publication.
 1832 – Muséum d'Histoire naturelle de La Rochelle moves to the Hôtel du Gouvernement.
 1844 –  opens in the Hôtel de Crussol d'Uzès.
 1847 – Fish market opens.
 1856 –  (train) begins operating.
 1867 – Delmas (shipping company) in business.
 1888 – Canal de Marans à la Rochelle built.
 1890 – La Pallice port built.
 1896 – Population: 28,376.
 1897 –  begins operating.
 1898 – Atlantique Stade Rochelais rugby club formed.
 1900 –  in business.

20th century

 1906 - Population: 33,858.
 1921 – Orbigny-Bernon Museum opens.
 1922 – Gare de La Rochelle (train station) built.
 1926 – Stade Marcel-Deflandre (stadium) opens.
 1940 – June: German occupation begins.(fr)
 1943 –  built by the German Organisation Todt.
 1944 – September: Allied siege of La Rochelle begins.
 1945 – May: Allied siege of La Rochelle ends; German forces ousted.
 1946 – Population: 48,923.
 1971 – Michel Crépeau elected mayor.
 1972 – Les Minimes marina constructed.
 1973
  built.
 1975 – Population: 79,757.
 1978 –  (museum) active.
 1981 –  (protected heritage area) established.
 1982 –  opens.
 1985 – Les Francofolies de La Rochelle music festival begins.
 1987 –  begins broadcasting.
 1988
 Île de Ré bridge and Aquarium de La Rochelle open.
 École supérieure de commerce de La Rochelle (business school) established.
 1993 – University of La Rochelle established.
 1998 –  (library) opens.
 1999 – Agglomeration community of La Rochelle (regional government) created.

21st century

 2002 –  (municipal newsletter) begins publication.
 2008
 March:  held.
  (train station) opens.
 2010 – Société rochelaise d'histoire moderne et contemporaine (history society) established.
 2012 – Population: 80,014.
 2013 – Semaine Olympique Française La Rochelle sailing race begins.
 2014 –  becomes mayor.
 2016 – La Rochelle becomes part of the Nouvelle-Aquitaine administrative region.

See also
 
 
 List of bishops of La Rochelle
 
  department and 

Other cities in the Nouvelle-Aquitaine region:
 Timeline of Bordeaux
 Timeline of Limoges
 Timeline of Poitiers

References

This article incorporates information from the French Wikipedia.

Bibliography

in English
 

in French

External links

  (city archives)
 
 Items related to La Rochelle, various dates (via Europeana)
 Items related to La Rochelle, various dates (via Digital Public Library of America)

La Rochelle
Rochelle